Plaviuk is a Slavic surname. Notable people with the surname include:

Mykola Plaviuk (1925–2012), Ukrainian social and political activist
Yaroslava Plaviuk (1926–2023), Ukrainian activist

Slavic-language surnames